Sunland, Inc., was a production plant established in 1988 located in Portales, New Mexico, in the United States. Sunland was the nation's largest organic peanut butter processor. The company produced at least 240 products. The company used Valencia peanuts in its products.

Product recall
In September 2012, Sunland issued an initial recall of the peanut butter it made and distributed due to Salmonella contamination. Officials from the Food and Drug Administration (FDA) found Salmonella bacteria all over the plant, as well as improper handling of the products, unclean equipment and uncovered trailers of peanuts outside the facility, expanding the recall to include all the company's products. On November 26, 2012, the FDA suspended Sunland's registration to produce and distribute food product. 
Sunland had the right to a hearing and prove to the FDA that its facilities are clean and can reopen.

Bankruptcy
On October 9, 2013 Sunland closed and filed for Chapter 7 bankruptcy. According to records, the company had an estimated $10 million to $50 million in assets, $50 million to $100 million in liabilities and 1,000 to 5,000 creditors.

See also
List of foodborne illness outbreaks in the United States

References

Companies based in New Mexico
Companies established in 1988
Companies that have filed for Chapter 7 bankruptcy
Food manufacturers of the United States
Food recalls
Peanut butter
Product recalls